Trachylepis is a skink genus in the subfamily Mabuyinae found mainly in Africa. Its members were formerly included in the "wastebin taxon" Mabuya, and for some time in Euprepis. As defined today, Trachylepis contains the clade of Afro-Malagasy mabuyas. The genus also contains a species from the Brazilian island of Fernando de Noronha, T. atlantica, and may occur in mainland South America with Trachylepis tschudii and Trachylepis maculata, both poorly known and enigmatic. The ancestors of T. atlantica are believed to have rafted across the Atlantic from Africa during the last 9 million years.

The generic name Trachylepis literally means "rough-scaled", referring to the fact that most of the species, though superficially smooth-scaled, have three or more slight longitudinal keels on their dorsal scales.

Species
The following species are recognized as being valid (listed alphabetically by specific name).
Trachylepis acutilabris  – wedge-snouted skink, sharp-lipped mabuya
Trachylepis adamastor  – Adamastor skink
Trachylepis affinis  – Senegal mabuya 
Trachylepis albilabris  – Guinea mabuya
Trachylepis albotaeniata  – Pemba Island mabuya
Trachylepis atlantica  – Noronha skink
Trachylepis aureogularis  – Guinea mabuya, orange-throated skink
Trachylepis aureopunctata  – gold-spotted mabuya
Trachylepis bayonii  – Bayão’s skink, Bayon's skink, Bayon's mabuya
Trachylepis bensonii  – Benson's mabuya
Trachylepis betsileana  – Betsileo mabuya
Trachylepis binotata  – Ovambo tree skink, Bocage's mabuya
Trachylepis bocagii  – Bocage's skink
Trachylepis boehmei  – Böhme's grass skink 
Trachylepis boettgeri  – Boettger's mabuya
Trachylepis boulengeri  – Boulenger's mabuya
Trachylepis brauni  – Braun's mabuya
Trachylepis brevicollis  – short-necked skink, Sudan mabuya

Trachylepis buettneri 
Trachylepis capensis  – Cape skink, Cape three-lined skink
Trachylepis casuarinae  – Casuarina Island skink
Trachylepis chimbana  – Chimba skink, Chimban mabuya
Trachylepis comorensis  – Comoro Island skink
Trachylepis cristinae  – Abd Al Kuri skink
Trachylepis damarana  – Damara skink
Trachylepis depressa  – eastern sand skink
Trachylepis dichroma  – two-coloured skink
Trachylepis dumasi 
Trachylepis elegans  – elegant mabuya 
Trachylepis ferrarai  – Ferrara's mabuya
Trachylepis gonwouoi  – Gonwouo’s skink
Trachylepis gravenhorstii  – Gravenhorst's mabuya
Trachylepis hemmingi  – Somali mabuya

Trachylepis hildebrandtii  – Hildebrandt’s skink
Trachylepis hoeschi  – Hoesch's mabuya 
Trachylepis homalocephala  – red-sided skink
Trachylepis infralineata 
Trachylepis irregularis  – alpine meadow mabuya

Trachylepis keroanensis  – Teita mabuya 
Trachylepis lacertiformis  – bronze rock skink
Trachylepis laevigata   – variable skink, striped-neck variable skink
Trachylepis laevis   – Angolan blue-tailed skink
Trachylepis langheldi   – Langheld's skink
Trachylepis lavarambo 
Trachylepis loluiensis  – Loloui Island skink
Trachylepis maculata  – spotted mabuya
Trachylepis maculilabris  – speckle-lipped skink, speckle-lipped mabuya
Trachylepis madagascariensis  – Malagasy mabuya
Trachylepis makolowodei  – Makolowodé's trachylepis 
Trachylepis margaritifera  – rainbow skink
Trachylepis megalura  – grass-top skink, long-tailed skink
Trachylepis mekuana 
Trachylepis mlanjensis  – Mulanje skink
Trachylepis monardi  – Monard’s skink
Trachylepis nancycoutuae 
Trachylepis nganghae 
Trachylepis occidentalis  – western three-striped skink
Trachylepis ozorii 
Trachylepis paucisquamis  – tropical mabuya
Trachylepis pendeana 
Trachylepis perrotetii  – Teita mabuya, African red-sided skink
Trachylepis planifrons  – tree skink
Trachylepis polytropis  – tropical mabuya
Trachylepis pulcherrima  – beautiful skink
Trachylepis punctatissima  – montane speckled skink, speckled rock skink
Trachylepis punctulata  – speckled sand skink, speckled skink
Trachylepis quinquetaeniata  – African five-lined skink, rainbow mabuya
Trachylepis raymondlaurenti  – Laurent's long-tailed skink
Trachylepis rodenburgi  – Rodenburg's mabuya

Trachylepis sechellensis  – Seychelles mabuya
Trachylepis socotrana  – Socotra skink
Trachylepis sparsa  – Karasburg tree skink
Trachylepis spilogaster  – Kalahari tree skink, spiny mabuya 
Trachylepis striata  – African striped mabuya, striped skink
Trachylepis sulcata  – western rock skink
Trachylepis tandrefana 
Trachylepis tavaratra 
Trachylepis tessellata  – tessellated mabuya
Trachylepis thomensis 
Trachylepis varia  – variable skink
Trachylepis variegata  – variegated skink
Trachylepis vato  – boulder mabuya
Trachylepis vezo 

Trachylepis volamenaloha 
Trachylepis wahlbergii  – Wahlberg's striped skink
Trachylepis wingati  – Wingate’s skink
Trachylepis wrightii  –Wright's skink, Wright's mabuya

Nota bene: A binomial authority in parentheses indicates that the species was originally described in a genus other than Trachylepis.

References

Further reading
Fitzinger L (1843). Systema Reptilium, Fasciculus Primus, Amblyglossae. Vienna: Braumüller & Seidel. 106 pp. + indices. (Trachylepis, new genus, p. 22). (in Latin).

 
Lizard genera
Taxa named by Leopold Fitzinger
Taxonomy articles created by Polbot